The New York Apartment Houses of Rosario Candela and James Carpenter is an illustrated book by American architecture historian Andrew Alpern. The book was initially published on February 2, 2002, by Acanthus Press. The book discusses the works of prominent New York architects of the 1920s and 1930s, Rosario Candela and J. E. R. Carpenter, who helped shape whole blocks in Manhattan. Their buildings are now the standard residentials of the New York's elite. The book contains a large number of photos and original floorplans of the discussed buildings, and several essays.

See also
740 Park: The Story of the World's Richest Apartment Building
Art Deco Architecture: Design, Decoration and Detail from the Twenties and Thirties

References

External links
 
Google Books profile

American art
2002 non-fiction books
American history books
Books about New York City